Frosta is a municipality in Trøndelag county, Norway.

Frosta may also refer to:

Places
 Frosta (village), a village in the municipality of Frosta in Trøndelag county, Norway
 Frosta Church, a church in the municipality of Frosta in Trøndelag county, Norway
 Frosta Hundred, a hundred in the traditional province of Scania in Sweden

Other uses
 Frosta AG, a German frozen food producer
 SS Frosta, a tanker ship that was involved in the MV George Prince ferry disaster
 Frosta (She-Ra), a character in She-Ra: Princess of Power

See also
 Frostating, a court in Frosta, Norway